The 2022 Northern Stars season saw the Northern Stars netball team compete in the 2022 ANZ Premiership. With a team coached by Kiri Wills, captained by Maia Wilson and featuring Gina Crampton, Anna Harrison and Kayla Johnson, Stars finished the regular season in second place, behind Central Pulse and above Northern Mystics. In the Elimination final, Stars defeated Mystics 63–57. Pulse then defeated Stars 56–37 in the Grand final.

Players

Player movements

2022 roster

Impact of COVID-19 pandemic

Matches cancelled
Just like the 2020 season, the 2022 season was impacted by the COVID-19 pandemic. Stars' Round 1 match against Central Pulse was cancelled following a COVID-19 outbreak in the Pulse squad. Further Stars' matches were cancelled throughout the season, most notably in early April when three of their matches were cancelled across Rounds 4 and 5.

Temporary replacement players
 Greer Sinclair, a Northern Stars training partner, played for four teams during the season. As well as played for Northern Comets in the National Netball League, she also played for Stars, Northern Mystics and Waikato Bay of Plenty Magic in the ANZ Premiership. She played for Stars in the Round 3 match against Southern Steel.
 Eseta Autagavaia scored for and against Stars during the season. After initially featuring as a replacement player for Stars, she finished the season playing for Waikato Bay of Plenty Magic. In Round 6 she scored for Stars in a 63–51 win against Mainland Tactix. In Round 9 she played and scored for Magic against Stars.
 Storm Purvis came out of retirement to play for Stars and made her 100th senior league appearance in a Round 10 match against Waikato Bay of Plenty Magic.
 Leana de Bruin partnered Elle Temu in defense in the absence of Anna Harrison, during the Round 10 match against Central Pulse. De Bruin was making her second league appearance of the 2022 ANZ Premiership after an earlier successful comeback for Waikato Bay of Plenty Magic.

Regular season

Fixtures and results
Round 1

Round 2

Round 3

Round 4

Round 5

Round 6

Rescheduled Round 4 match

Round 7

Round 8

Round 9

 
Round 10 

Round 11

Round 12

Round 13
Rescheduled matches

Notes
  Matches postponed under the ANZ Premiership's COVID-19 Match Postponement Policy.

Final standings

Finals Series

Elimination final

Grand final

Award winners

Team of the season
Five Stars players featured in Brendon Egan's Stuff's team of the season.

Stuff Super Seven 

Bench

Robinhood Stars Awards

References

2022
2022 ANZ Premiership season
2022 in New Zealand netball